Heckling may refer to:

 Heckler, a person who shouts a disparaging comment
 Heckling (flax), a process in preparing flax for spinning

See also
 Heckling comb, a tool used in flax preparation
 The Heckling Hare, a Merrie Melodies cartoon